Ed or Edward Gordon may refer to:

 Edward Gordon, Baron Gordon of Drumearn (1814–1879), Scottish judge and politician
 Edward Gordon (politician) (1885–1964), New Zealand politician
 Edward R. Gordon (1886–1938), American director and actor, see Water Rustlers
 Ed Gordon (athlete) (1908–1971), American long jumper
 Ed Gordon (journalist) (born 1960), American television journalist 
 Edward Larry Gordon or Laraaji (born 1943), American musician
 Edward Gordon (bowls), Irish lawn bowler
 Edward Francis Gordon (1928-2013), Kansas state legislator

See also
Eddie Gordon (disambiguation)
Ted Gordon, Rear Admiral